Polykastano is a village and a community of the Voio municipality. Before the 2011 local government reform it was part of the municipality of Tsotyli, of which it was a municipal district. The 2011 census recorded 120 inhabitants in the village. According to the statistics of Vasil Kanchov ("Macedonia, Ethnography and Statistics"), 250 Greek Christians lived in the village in 1900.

References

Populated places in Kozani (regional unit)